The Club Westside is a private tennis club located in Houston, Texas.  It was the former home (2001–2007) to the ATP Tour U.S. Men's Clay Court Championships.  Gallery Furniture Stadium, located on the club's premises, was the home of the Houston Wranglers of World TeamTennis. The stadium also hosted the Tennis Masters Cup in 2003 and 2004.

Recent changes
The club was unique in that it offered courts of all the Grand Slam surfaces: Rebound Ace (Australian Open), red clay (French Open), grass (Wimbledon), and DecoTurf (US Open). The clay courts were the only courts in the United States that were identical to those at Roland Garros. The grass courts were designed and installed under the supervision of David Kimpton of the Queen's Club. There were 46 courts in total, including 10 indoors. Gallery Furniture Stadium had a capacity of 5,240 spectators.

In December 2006, the club management decided to change the fundamentals and become an all-around sports and family club instead of a strictly tennis club. It converted its red clay into swimming pools and more hard courts and added a waterpark. The current facilities include 22 outdoor hard courts and 4 indoor hard courts.

See also
Houston Wranglers
U.S. Men's Clay Court Championships
 List of tennis stadiums by capacity

References

External links 
 Official site

Tennis venues in Texas
Sports venues in Houston
Tennis clubs